Central Manawa are a New Zealand netball team based in Wellington. Since 2016 they have represented Netball Central in the National Netball League. Netball Central is the governing body that represents the Hawke's Bay, Manawatū-Whanganui, Taranaki and Wellington Regions. They are effectively the reserve team of Central Pulse. Between 2016 and 2018 they played as Central Zone. Since 2019, they have played as Central Manawa.  Between 2017 and 2019, Central Zone/Central Manawa won three successive NNL titles. In 2022, Central Manawa won a fourth title.

History

Foundation
In 2016, Central Zone where founder members of Netball New Zealand's National Netball League. In the inaugural grand final a Central Zone team coached by Yvette McCausland-Durie lost 51–46 to Netball South.

Three successive titles
In 2017, Central Zone won their first National Netball League title. With a team featuring Karin Burger, Rhiarna Ferris, Tiana Metuarau, Kimiora Poi and Ainsleyana Puleiata, they won the title after defeating Hellers Netball Mainland 43–41 in the grand final at The Trusts Arena. Central Zone retained the title in 2018 after defeating Waikato Bay of Plenty 62–53 in the grand final. Ahead of the 2019 season, the team adopted a new name, voted on by the public. The now renamed Central Manawa, completed a three in a row after defeating Waikato Bay of Plenty 49–46 in the 2019 grand final.

Fourth title
In 2022 with a team featuring Renee Matoe, Parris Mason and Amelia Walmsley, Central Manawa won a fourth title after defeating Mainland 49–41 in the grand final.

Grand Finals

Notable players

Internationals

 Eseta Autagavaia
 Ainsleyana Puleiata
 Saviour Tui

 'Api Taufa
 Salote Taufa

Central Pulse players

ANZ Premiership players
 Abby Erwood
 Kelsey McPhee
 Grace Namana

Others
 Rhiarna Ferris,  New Zealand women's rugby sevens international

NNL Player of the Year

Coaches

Head coaches

Assistant coaches

Honours
National Netball League
Winners: 2017, 2018, 2019, 2022 
Runners Up: 2016

References

  
Central Pulse
Netball teams in New Zealand
National Netball League (New Zealand)
Sports clubs established in 2016
2016 establishments in New Zealand
Sport in Wellington